The Juno Award for Album of the Year is an annual award presented by the Canadian Academy of Recording Arts and Sciences for the best album released in Canada. It has been awarded since 1975, though it was the award for Best Selling Album from 1975 to 1979. From 1999 to 2002, it was awarded under the name of Best Album. The award goes to the artist.

Achievements
Arcade Fire, Celine Dion, Michael Bublé and The Weeknd are the artists with the most wins in this category with three each; Dion is the most nominated artist with 12 nominations.

Recipients

Album awards of 1974
At the Juno Awards of 1974, no single prize was awarded for best album, but three artists were each awarded for albums in different categories.

Best Selling Album (1975–1979)

Album of the Year (1980–1998)

Best Album (1999–2002)

Album of the Year (2003–present)

See also

Music of Canada

References

Album
Album awards